The Ministry of Defense (MoD) is a cabinet-level office in charge of defense-related matters of Kenya. It oversees the Kenya Defense Forces. It is currently headed by Aden Duale.

History 
During the Shifta War, a centralized high command was established, however the Ministry of Defence was mostly dormant the service commanders came under the direct operational control of the president. From 1979-2000, Ministry of Defence was renamed to the Department of Defence (DoD), placed under the Office of the President Daniel arap Moi and led by the Deputy Secretary. he DoD dealt mostly with administrative and logistical matters.

Building 
The Ministry of Defence is located at Ulinzi House off Lenana Road in Nairobi.

Structure 

 Administration Department
 Finance Department
 Accounts Department
 Head of Public Communications
 Director Policy, Strategy and Planning
 Human Resource Management and Development
 Supply Chain Department
 Internal Auditor General
 Information Communications Technology

Cabinet Secretary 
The Cabinet Secretary oversees the Ministry of Defence and is the policy maker of the KDF and chief defence policy advisor to the President of Kenya. He/She serves as Chairman of the Defence Council, the supreme body of the MoD that manages the Kenya Defence Forces.

List

Minister of Defence 

 Munyua Waiyaki (1963-1965)
 Njoroge Mungai (1965-1966)
 James Gichuru (1974-1978)

Minister of State for Defence 

 Julius Lekakeny Sunkuli (2000-2003)
 Chris Murungaru (2003-2005)
 Njenga Karume (2006-2008)
 Mohamed Yusuf Haji (2008–2013)

Cabinet Secretary for Defense 

 Raychelle Omamo (2013–2020)
 Monica Juma (2020–2021)
 Eugene Wamalwa (2021–present)

Defence Council 
The duties and responsibilities of the Defence Council are to oversee overall policy and supervise the KDF:

 Secretary (Chairman)
 Chief of the Defence Forces (CDF)
 The three commanders of the KDF
 MoD Principal Secretary

See also 

 President of Kenya
 Kenya Defence Forces

Notes and references

External links 

 MoD website

Government of Kenya
Military of Kenya